Herrgårdsost (Manorhouse cheese) is a semi-hard Swedish cheese made from cow's milk. The aged cheese has a mild,  nutty and creamy  taste. The cheese has  small round holes and a waxed surface.

Herrgårdsost began to be manufactured at Swedish manor houses in the 19th century. Herrgårdsost usually  starts as pasteurized part-skim milk. Bacterial starters are introduced including lactic acid bacteria, which acidify the milk, and propionic bacteria, which are responsible for producing the carbon dioxide that creates the holes. The whey is drained and the curd is pressed, forming a wheel,  which is then salted in brine. The cheese wheels are later coated in wax. They are aged in this state usually for at least three or four months, but often up to one or two years.

See also

References

Other sources
 p. 58

Swedish cheeses
Cow's-milk cheeses